"How Do I Breathe" is a song recorded by American singer Mario. It is the first single from his third studio album Go. The single was released on May 15, 2007. It was produced by Norwegian production team Stargate. On the issue date of July 7, 2007, the single debuted on the Billboard Hot 100 at number 91. "How Do I Breathe" also debuted on the UK Singles Chart at number 30 on download sales alone, the day before the physical release of the song. It also became Mario's last charting single in the UK. The song also peaked at number 18 on the Billboard Hot R&B/Hip-Hop Songs chart. The official remix of the song features Fabolous and the second official remix features Cassidy. A rare third one features both artists and switches between beats. The song was co-written by Mario.

Writing and recording
Mario met Stargate, the producers from Norway. They met when Mario was overseas touring, and they talked about producing. They were up-and-coming at the time. Mario frequently heard their music on the radio and would later say he thought, "Wow, I really like their music. These guys are classic." Mario and Stargate made two songs, which they collaborated on with Ne-Yo, but they did not make the cut. Then they did two more songs, which Mario co-wrote, one of which was "How Do I Breathe". Mario said: "The truth is that I felt like the track already had a story to tell; but that there had to be a certain flow over the record. I had to show some vulnerability, and that is what the record is about. It's about being vulnerable and knowing that you lost something that so essential to your life. I'd say it's about 75% true to life, and the rest is just creative writing."

Critical reception
Mark Edward Nero of About.com says "The track isn't particularly groundbreaking, but it has a simple charm, in a sort of Ne-Yo meets Toni Braxton kind of way".

Aaron Fields of KSTW.com stated: "First single off the album, yet didn't have the success like "Let me love you" did. I remember thinking he was definitely back when I heard this song. I'm not sure why this song didn't get more attention as it is one of the better songs done by him, nevertheless I probably would have picked this for the first single as well. I still bump this one in the car."

Music video
The video was directed by Melina and premiered on BET's Access Granted on May 23, 2007. One scene where Mario is dressed in a white t-shirt while singing in smoke, is similar to the scene in Kanye West's video "Touch the Sky". After its premiere, "How Do I Breathe" received heavy airplay on BET's music video countdown show 106 & Park. It also appeared at number 87 on BET's Notarized: Top 100 Videos of 2007 countdown.

Track listings
UK CD:
 "How Do I Breathe" (radio edit)
 "How Do I Breathe" (Full Phat remix featuring Rhymefest)

How Do I Breathe, Pt. 2:
 "How Do I Breathe" (radio edit)
 "How Do I Breathe" (Full Phat Remix featuring Rhymefest)
 "How Do I Breathe" (Allister Whitehead Remix)
 "How Do I Breathe" (video)

CD single
 "How Do I Breathe" (radio edit) – 3:38
 "How Do I Breathe" (instrumental) – 3:38
 "How Do I Breathe" (call out hook) – 0:10

Charts

Weekly charts

Year-end charts

Certifications

References

External links
 

2006 songs
2007 singles
Mario (singer) songs
J Records singles
Music videos directed by Melina Matsoukas
Song recordings produced by Stargate (record producers)
Songs written by Tor Erik Hermansen
Songs written by Mikkel Storleer Eriksen